Duilio Antonio Rafael Brunello (30 May 1925 - 9 May 2021) was an Argentine Peronist politician. He served in the Argentine Senate, the Argentine Chamber of Deputies and as Federal Interventor of Córdoba, Argentina from March 15, 1974 to September 7, 1974.

Brunello was elected to the Senate in 1955 for Catamarca Province, taking office in April 1955. The coup of September 1955 dissolved the Senate. He was later a vice-president of the Justicialist Party and was a national deputy at the time of the 1976 coup. He has also been deputy minister for Social Development.

In 1990, Brunello received a presidential pardon from Carlos Menem relating to charges of embezzling government funds.

References

Governors of Córdoba Province, Argentina
1925 births
2021 deaths
Members of the Argentine Senate for Catamarca
Members of the Argentine Chamber of Deputies elected in Catamarca
Justicialist Party politicians
Government ministers of Argentina
People from Catamarca Province